In the Key of Lightnin' is an album by blues musician Lightnin' Hopkins, recorded at the sessions that produced Lightnin'! in California in 1969, but not released until 2002 on the Tomato label.

Reception

The Penguin Guide to Blues Recordings said: "In the Key of Lightnin''' contains unissued material from the Poppy sessions with the full band on "What'd I Say" and "Katie May". Five tracks are snatches of inconsequential talking".

Track listing
All compositions by Sam "Lightnin'" Hopkins except where noted
 "Lightnin' Declares" – 0:20	
 "Cryin' Shame (Shake That Thing)" – 2:32	
 "Last Night I Lost the Best Friend I Ever Had" – 2:52	
 "Baby, Please Lend Me Your Love" – 3:14
 "Short Haired Woman" Discourse – 0:28	
 "Short Haired Woman" – 3:27	
 "Cigar" Chatter – 0:41	
 "Pneumonia Blues" (Blind Lemon Jefferson) – 2:42	
 "What'd I Say" (Ray Charles) – 2:32	
 "Katie Mae" – 6:38	
 "Black Cadillac" – 3:03	
 "One for the Gamblin'" – 3:45	
 "I Gave Up Card Playin'" Pronouncement'' – 0:28	
 "I Once Was a Gambler" – 1:45	
 "Where Did You Stay Last Night?" – 3:46	
 "Careless Love" (Traditional) – 1:59	
 ""Black Lightnin'" Rap" – 0:30	
 "Lightnin' Slow Blues" – 2:49

Personnel

Performance
Lightnin' Hopkins – electric guitar, vocals
Francis Clay – drums (tracks 2, 3, 6, 8–11, 15, 16 & 18)
Jeff Carp – harmonica (tracks 9 & 10)
Paul Asbell – guitar (tracks 9 & 10)
Moose Walker – piano (tracks 9 & 10)
Geno Skaggs – bass (tracks 1, 9 & 10)

Production
Jim Malloy, Kevin Eggers – producer

References

Lightnin' Hopkins albums
2002 albums
Tomato Records albums